Lettowianthus is a genus of plant in family Annonaceae. It contains a single species, Lettowianthus stellatus, which is found in Kenya and Tanzania.

References

Annonaceae
Annonaceae genera
Monotypic magnoliid genera
Vulnerable plants
Flora of Kenya
Flora of Tanzania
Taxonomy articles created by Polbot